The 2016–17 St. Bonaventure Bonnies men's basketball team represented St. Bonaventure University during the 2016–17 NCAA Division I men's basketball season. The Bonnies, led by tenth-year head coach Mark Schmidt, played their home games at the Reilly Center in Olean, New York as members of the Atlantic 10 Conference. They finished the regular season 20–12, 11–7 in A-10 play to finish in fifth place. They received the No. 5 seed in the A-10 tournament where they defeated UMass in the second round to advance to the quarterfinals where they lost to Rhode Island

Previous season
The Bonnies finished the 2015–16 season 22–9, 14–4 in A-10 play to finish in a three-way tie for the regular season championship. They lost in the quarterfinals of the A-10 tournament to Davidson. While the two other teams who tied with Saint Bonaventure for the A-10 title received at-large bids to the NCAA tournament, the Bonnies were one of the "First Four Out" and instead received a top seed in the National Invitation Tournament where they lost in the first round to Wagner.

Offseason

Departures

Incoming transfers

2016 recruiting class

Preseason 
The Bonnies were picked to finish fifth in the A-10 preseason poll. Jaylen Adams was selected the Preseason All-Conference First Team.

Roster

Schedule and results

|-
!colspan=9 style=|  Exhibition

|-
!colspan=9 style=|  Non-conference regular season

|-
!colspan=12 style=| Atlantic 10 regular season

|-
!colspan=9 style=| Atlantic 10 tournament

See also
 2016–17 St. Bonaventure Bonnies women's basketball team

References

St. Bonaventure Bonnies men's basketball seasons
St. Bonaventure